The Federal Ministry of Water Resources is a Ministry of the Federal Government of Nigeria responsible for the management of water supply, irrigation, freshwater, and aquaculture in Nigeria. The ministry was established in 1976. It was established to manage the eleven river basin development authorities in Nigeria. Engr. Suleiman Hussaini Adamu FNSE, FAEng. is the current Minister of Federal Ministry of Water Resources. Engr. Suleiman Hussaini Adamu FNSE, FAEng. Sarah Reng Ochekpe and took charge of the affairs of the Ministry of water resources in 11 November 2015, by President Muhammadu Buhari

Responsibilities

The Federal Ministry of Water Resources is created to provide sustainable access to safe and sufficient water to meet the cultural and socio-economic needs of all Nigerians in a way that will enhance public health, food security and poverty reduction, while maintaining the integrity of fresh water ecosystem of the nation.

Parastatals

Anambra-Imo River Basin Development Authority

Benin-Owena River Basin Development Authority

Chad Basin River Development Authority

Cross-River River Basin  Development Authority

Hadejia Jama'are River Basin  Development Authority

Ogun-osun River Basin  Development Authority

Lower Benue River Basin  Development Authority

Lower Niger River Basin  Development Authority

Niger Delta River Basin  Development Authority

Upper Benue River Basin  Development Authority

Upper Niger River Basin  Development Authority

Sokoto-Rima River Basin  Development Authority 

Departments

Dams and Reservoir Operations

Finance and Accounts

General Services

Human Resource Management

Hydrology

Internal Audit

Irrigation & Drainage

Procurement

Reform Co-ordination and Service Improvement

River Basin Operations and Inspectorate

Special Duties

Water Quality Control & Sanitation

Water Resources Planning and Technical Support Services

Water Supply and PPP

References 

Federal Ministries of Nigeria
Rural development in Nigeria
Agricultural organizations based in Nigeria